Sakharwadi is a village in Phaltan tehsil of Satara district in Maharashtra state of India.

The main business in Sakharwadi is farming.  The population is between 25,000 to 27,000. The village has a primary school up to the 12th standard, a sugar factory and a dairy milk factory.

Villages in Satara district